Killiecrankie is a rural locality on Flinders Island in the local government area (LGA) of Flinders in the North-east LGA region of Tasmania. The 2016 census recorded a population of 24 for the state suburb of Killiecrankie.
It is the location of the Killiecrankie Airstrip.

History 
Killiecrankie was gazetted as a locality in 1956. It is believed to be named for Killiecrankie in Scotland.

Geography
The waters of Bass Strait form the north-western and western boundaries.

Road infrastructure 
Route B85 (Palana Road) runs through from south to north.

References

Towns in Tasmania
Flinders Island